Ivanna Klympush-Tsintsadze (born 5 July 1972) is a Ukrainian politician and journalist, and former Vice-Prime-Minister for European and Euro-Atlantic Integration of Ukraine.

Early life 

Ivanna Klympush-Tsintsadze was born on 5 July 1972 in Kyiv, Ukraine. She is the daughter of Yaroslava Klympush and Orest Klympush.

Education 

1992 – trained at the Summer School of Harvard Ukrainian Research Institute, Harvard University (USA).

1994 – graduated from the National Pedagogical Dragomanov University, a speciality – defectology and speech therapy. Has received diploma of the specialist (with honors).

1993–1994 – studied at the State University of Montana (USA), speciality – international relations and international law.

1997 – graduated from the Institute of International Relations of Taras Shevchenko National University of Kyiv with a degree in international relations and received a bachelor's degree in international relations.

1998 – received a master's degree in International Relations (with honors).

Career 

1991–1993 – Speech therapist at the Children's Territorial Medical Association of Starokyivsky District;

1994–1999 – Project Manager, Head of the Department of International Relations, NGO 'Ukrainian Independent Center for Political Studies';

1999–2002 – Project Manager at 'Kyiv Center of the East-West Institute';

2001–2002 – Acting Director of the 'Kyiv Center of the East-West Institute';

2002–2007 – Correspondent in the Ukrainian BBC Radio Service (BBC) in US (Washington) and in the Caucasus (Tbilisi);

2007–2009 – Deputy Director for Programs of the International Charitable Organization 'Fund for Support of International Cooperation of Ukraine' ('Open Ukraine Foundation');

2009–2011 – Director of the International Charitable Organization "Fund for Support of International Cooperation of Ukraine" ("Open Ukraine Foundation");

Since 2011 – Director of charitable organization 'Yalta European Strategy';

In 1994–99 Ivanna Klympush worked for the Ukrainian Independent Center of Political Research, while attending the Institute of International Relations in University of Kyiv which she graduated in 1998.

board member of the Public Organization 'Ukrainian Media Center' ('Ukrainian Crisis Media Center'); Alumni of 'Aspen-Ukraine' Association; Member of supervisory boards of the NGO 'Institute for Economic Research and Policy Consulting' and NGO 'Ukrainian Institute of Public Policy'.

Co-author of the book 'The Black Sea Region: Cooperation and Security'.

Parliamentary background 
During the elections to the Verkhovna Rada of the VIII convocation (2014) she passed to the Parliament from the party Petro Poroshenko Bloc 'The Solidarity' under the number 61. She was MP from 27 November 2014 to 14 April 2016.

In the July 2019 Ukrainian parliamentary election Klympush-Tsintsadze was placed tenth on the party list of European Solidarity. She was elected to parliament.

Government background 
On 14 April 2016, Ukrainian Parliament appointed a new Cabinet of Ministers of Ukraine, where Ivanna Klympush-Tsintsadze got the position of Vice Prime Minister for European and Euro-Atlantic Integration.

On 18 April 2016, the Cabinet of Ministers of Ukraine appointed Ivanna Klympush-Tsintsadze, Vice Prime Minister for European and Euro-Atlantic Integration, responsible for Ukraine's international relations and European integration (Resolution of the Cabinet of Ministers of Ukraine No. 296 dated 18 April 2016).
 First Vice Chairwoman of the Committee on Foreign Affairs of the Verkhovna Rada of Ukraine;
 Chairwoman of the Permanent Delegation to Ukraine of the Parliamentary Assembly of NATO;
 Member of the Ukrainian part of the Parliamentary Association Committee; 
 Head of Inter-Parliamentary Group of Friends "Ukraine-EU";
 Head of the Group on Inter-Parliamentary Relations with Georgia;
 First Vice Co-Chair of the Inter-Parliamentary Relations Unit with the United States of America;
 Member of the Inter-Parliamentary Relations Group with the Republic of India;
 Member of the Inter-Parliamentary Relations Group with the Federal Republic of Germany;
 Member of the Inter-Parliamentary Relations Group with Canada;
 Member of the Inter-Parliamentary Relations Unit with the United Kingdom of Great Britain and Northern Ireland;
 Member of the Inter-Parliamentary Relations Group with the Republic of Poland.

24 November 2016 Ivanna Klympush-Tsintsadze and Johannes Hahn (European Commissioner for Neighbourhood and Enlargement Negotiations) signed the agreement on financing the EUACI.

Personal life 
Klympush-Tsintsadze is married to Archil Tsintsadze. They have two daughters – Solomiia and Melaniia.

Real estate 
Declaration for 2016.

References

External links
 Ivanna Klympush. who is who. 20 November 2015
 Profile in the Official Ukraine Today (dovidka.com)
 Ukraine’s reshuffled Cabinet of Ministers. The Ukrainian Weekly. 15 April 2016

1972 births
Living people
Politicians from Kyiv
Taras Shevchenko National University of Kyiv, Institute of International Relations alumni
National Pedagogical Dragomanov University alumni
Eighth convocation members of the Verkhovna Rada
Vice Prime Ministers of Ukraine
European integration ministers of Ukraine
21st-century Ukrainian women politicians
Women government ministers of Ukraine
Ninth convocation members of the Verkhovna Rada
Journalists from Kyiv
Ukrainian people of Georgian descent
Women members of the Verkhovna Rada